The Chinese Taipei men's national tennis team represents Taiwan in Davis Cup tennis competition and are governed by the Chinese Taipei Tennis Association.

Chinese Taipei currently compete in the Asia/Oceania Zone Group II.

History 

Chinese Taipei competed in its first Davis Cup in 1972.  They reached in the World Group I playoff in 2021.

2022

World Group II 

 Wu Tung-Lin (Singles – ATP #204; Doubles – ATP #249)
 Tseng Chun-Hsin (Singles – ATP #90; Doubles – ATP #369)
 Jason Jung (Singles – ATP #166; Doubles – ATP #422; Doubles – ATP #1303)

2021

World Group I, Play-offs 

 Wu Tung-Lin (Singles – ATP #267; Doubles – ATP #620)
 Tseng Chun-Hsin (Singles – ATP #250; Doubles – ATP #440)
 Yang Tsun-Hua (Singles – ATP #515; Doubles – ATP #330)
 Hsieh Cheng-Peng (Doubles – ATP #200)
 Lin Han-Chih

2019

Group II 

 Jason Jung (Singles – ATP #166; Doubles – ATP #625)
 Wu Tung-Lin (Singles – ATP #267; Doubles – ATP #620)
 Yang Tsun-Hua (Singles – ATP #515; Doubles – ATP #330)
 Tseng Chun-Hsin (Singles – ATP #250; Doubles – ATP #440)
 Hsieh Cheng-Peng (Doubles – ATP #200)

2018

Group II 

 Chen Ti (Singles – ATP #1333; Doubles – ATP #1429)
 Lee Kuan-Yi (Singles – ATP #948; Doubles – ATP #1351)
 Yu Cheng-Yu (Singles – ATP #1096; Doubles – ATP #1543)
 Tseng Chun-Hsin (Singles – ATP #250; Doubles – ATP #440)

Group II, Play-offs 

 Jason Jung (Singles – ATP #166; Doubles – ATP #625)
 Yang Tsun-Hua (Singles – ATP #515; Doubles – ATP #330)
 Hsu Yu-Hsiou (Singles – ATP #365; Doubles – ATP #259)
 Hsieh Cheng-Peng (Doubles – ATP #200)
 Peng Hsien-Yin

2017

Group I 

 Jason Jung (Singles – ATP #166; Doubles – ATP #625)
 Chen Ti (Singles – ATP #1333; Doubles – ATP #1429)
 Lee Kuan-Yi (Singles – ATP #948; Doubles – ATP #1351)
 Peng Hsien-Yin

Group I play-offs 

 Jason Jung (Singles – ATP #166; Doubles – ATP #625)
 Chen Ti (Singles – ATP #1333; Doubles – ATP #1429)
 Wu Tung-Lin (Singles – ATP #267; Doubles – ATP #620)
 Yu Cheng-Yu (Singles – ATP #1096; Doubles – ATP #1543)

2016

Group II, First Round 

 Lu Yen-Hsun (Singles – ATP #572; Doubles – ATP #541)
 Huang Liang-Chi
 Hung Jui-Chen
 Yi Chu-Huan

Group II, Semi Final 

 Chen Ti (Singles – ATP #1333; Doubles – ATP #1429)
 Huang Liang-Chi
 Hung Jui-Chen
 Wang Chieh-Fu

Group II, Final 

 Yang Tsun-Hua (Singles – ATP #515; Doubles – ATP #330)
 Lee Kuan-Yi (Singles – ATP #948; Doubles – ATP #1351)
 Hung Jui-Chen
 Wang Chieh-Fu

2015

Group II 

 Lu Yen-Hsun (Singles – ATP #572; Doubles – ATP #541)
 Hung Jui-Chen
 Wang Chieh-Fu
 Ho Chih-Jen

Group II, Semi Final 

 Lu Yen-Hsun (Singles – ATP #572; Doubles – ATP #541)
 Hung Jui-Chen
 Peng Hsien-Yin
 Lee Hsin-Han

Group II, Final 

 Jimmy Wang (tennis) (Doubles – ATP #1343)
 Hung Jui-Chen
 Peng Hsien-Yin
 Wang Chieh-Fu

2014

Group I 

 Yang Tsun-Hua (Singles – ATP #515; Doubles – ATP #330)
 Chen Ti (Singles – ATP #1333; Doubles – ATP #1429)
 Peng Hsien-Yin
 Lee Hsin-Han

Group I, Play-offs Semi Final 

 Chen Ti (Singles – ATP #1333; Doubles – ATP #1429)
 Hung Jui-Chen
 Wang Chieh-Fu
 Peng Hsien-Yin

Group I, Play-offs Final 

 Yang Tsun-Hua (Singles – ATP #515; Doubles – ATP #330)
 Hung Jui-Chen
 Wang Chieh-Fu
 Peng Hsien-Yin

See also 

 Davis Cup
 Chinese Taipei Fed Cup team

External links 

Davis Cup teams
 Davis Cup
 Davis Cup